Cephalophis is a genus of flowering plants belonging to the family Acanthaceae.

Its native range is Eastern and Southern Tropical Africa.

Species:
 Cephalophis lukei Vollesen

References

Acanthaceae
Acanthaceae genera